Tawus Ibn Kaysan (died 723) was one of the Tabi‘in, one of the narrators of hadith and scholars of fiqh.

He is also known as Tawoos ibn Kaysaan, "Tawoos" or "al-Taus,".

Biography
He was one of the scholars of the Tabi‘in, one of the narrators of hadith, and a companion of, Ali Zayn al-Abidin, Ali Ibn al-Hussein. Ibn Hajar related that Tawus was a Persian who inhabited an area called al-Jund and that he was the master of Hamadan in Iran. Ibn Hayyan said about him: He was among the worshipers of the people of the Yemen  and the masters of the leading members of the next generation.” He performed the hajj forty times and narrated some of the whispered prayers of Imām Zayn al-‘Ābidin. Ibn Kaysan was also a student of Abdullah ibn Abbas. It was said that he was a great tabi’i who met over 50 companions. Tawus heard all the ahadeeth from the mouth of ibn Abbas. Tawus himself was the main teacher of Umar ibn Abdul Aziz.

Abdullah ibn Abbas loved Tawus so much that he said that "I believe that Tawus is from the people of Jannah". Also Ibn Kathir wrote that he met 50 of the Sahaba.

Hadith
Hadith from him are recorded by Muhammad al-Bukhari (85 traditions), Muslim ibn al-Hajjaj (78 traditions), al-Tirmidhi, al-Nasa'i, Abu Dawood, Ibn Maja, Ahmad ibn Hanbal.

References

Tabi‘un
Tabi‘un hadith narrators
720s deaths
Year of birth unknown